West Dolan Township is an inactive township in Cass County, in the U.S. state of Missouri.

West Dolan Township was established in 1873.

References

Townships in Missouri
Townships in Cass County, Missouri